Flappers was a Canadian television sitcom airing on the CBC from 1979 to 1981. It was set in a Montreal night club during the Roaring Twenties. It followed the people who work in and around the club.  Television producer Jack Humphrey wrote the pilot for Flappers and served as executive producer for the series.

The title refers to the 1920s term Flappers.

Flappers was directed by Alan Erlich, and produced by Joseph Partington,
with Jack Humphrey as executive producer.

Main cast

Susan Roman —  May
Andrée Cousineau —  Yvonne Marie
Denise Proulx —  Francine
Michael Donaghue —  Andy
Victor Désy —  Oscar
Edward Atienza —  Uncle Rummy
Robert Lalonde —  Robert
Gail Dahms —  Bunny
Derek McGrath — Sam McTaggart

External links
 
 TVArchive
  Canadian Communications Foundation Broadcast History

CBC Television original programming
1979 Canadian television series debuts
1981 Canadian television series endings
Television series set in the 1920s
Television shows set in Montreal
1970s Canadian sitcoms
1980s Canadian sitcoms
Flappers